Centralia may refer to:

Places

Australia
Central Australia, sometimes called "Centralia"

Canada
 Centralia, Ontario
 RCAF Station Centralia, a former Royal Canadian Air Force training base
 Centralia (Essery Field) Aerodrome

United States
 Centralia Township, Marion County, Illinois
 Centralia, Illinois, a city
 Centralia station (Illinois), an Amtrak station
 Centralia Municipal Airport
 Centralia Correctional Center, a medium-security state prison for men
 Lake Centralia, Marion County, Illinois, a reservoir
 Centralia, Iowa, a city
 Centralia, Kansas, a city
 Centralia Township, Boone County, Missouri
 Centralia, Missouri, a city
 Centralia, New York, a hamlet
 Centralia, original name of Fargo, North Dakota
 Centralia, Oklahoma, an unincorporated community
 Centralia, Pennsylvania, a borough and near-ghost town
 Centralia, Texas, an unincorporated community
 Centralia, Virginia, an unincorporated community
 Centralia, Washington, a city
 Centralia Coal Mine, an open-pit coal mine
 Centralia station (Washington), an Amtrak station
 Centralia Canal, Washington
 Centralia, West Virginia, an unincorporated community
 Centralia, Wisconsin, a city that merged with Grand Rapids to form what is now Wisconsin Rapids

Schools
 Centralia College, Centralia, Washington, United States
 Centralia College of Agricultural Technology, Huron Lake, Ontario, Canada, a former college
 Centralia High School (disambiguation), various schools in the United States

Other uses
 Centralia (album), 2007 debut album by Car Bomb
 "Centralia", a song by God Is an Astronaut on the 2015 album Helios / Erebus

See also
Centralian Advocate, an Australian newspaper
 Centrale (disambiguation)